Core & Satellite Portfolio Management is an investment strategy that incorporates traditional fixed-income and equity-based securities (i.e. index funds, exchange-traded funds (ETFs), passive mutual funds, etc.) known as the "core" portion of the portfolio, with a percentage of selected individual securities in the fixed-income and equity-based side of the portfolio known as the "satellite" portion.

Core portfolio
The "Core" is made of passively managed securities (e.g. index funds, ETFs, passive mutual funds, individual securities) and uses a traditional benchmark (e.g. Russell 3000 or the S&P 1500) to benchmark/compare for performance.  The positions may have a particular style bias (e.g.  more small cap stocks over mid/large cap companies, more value positions over growth positions, higher or lower concentration in developed international markets) and is sometimes consistent with the MONECO Seven Asset Allocation Management Theme.  The market downturn of 2008 has many experts in the investments industry questioning the validity of asset allocation as a means for diversifying and managing overall risks associated with investing in stocks.  As a consequence, other alternatives are now gaining force.  Owning a core equity portfolio centered on a theme of dividend growth continues to gain momentum as individuals are faced with a growing likelihood of outliving their investable assets.  With a core centered on dividend growth, individuals create a growing income stream irrespective of the account value associated with growth in the underlying assets.

Satellite portfolio
The "Satellite" portion, by contrast, comprises holdings that the advisor expects will add alpha, the financial term for returns exceeding systematic. Holdings may include actively managed stocks, mutual funds, and separate account managers with a particular sector, region of positions, or Micro or Mega Cap Company Holdings, or passively managed assets with a particular style that is counter to, or even enhances, the style bias of the core. Short holding periods and tax-inefficient positions may result in short-term capital gains or losses.

If the entire allotment of the satellite portion is not deemed worthy of inclusion, that portion will either be reallocated across "core" positions or in a "satellite holder"—a position that mirrors some aspect of the core (generally the position most closely resembling the benchmark) that is quickly traded when an opportunity is identified without causing major tax implications (e.g., issues with FIFO based trades).

This satellite allocation may be implemented into 100% equity allocations and/or allocations that blend with fixed-income or non-equity positions. The satellite portfolio may be used occasionally for fixed-income investing (emerging market debt, junk bonds, individual bonds) but generally it is dedicated to: equities and alternative assets such as: hedge funds, REITs, commodities, options, and foreign currencies. Principal protected notes may also be used; these investments are truly hybrid in that they provide a guaranteed return of principal while providing upside participation in a number of equity and alternative-investments asset classes.

Portfolios are more than a collection of financial assets and the satellite investments must be selected and managed considering the portfolio as a whole. The satellite should improve not only the return but the risk/return profile of the portfolio, and not only quantitatively (the Sharpe ratio or whatever other risk/return measures used) but also qualitatively, by adding sources of value (e.g. non-correlated strategies, short and medium-term investment ideas, risk-asymmetric assets, etc.) different from that in the core but still consistent with the market and economic view and the client's financial planning goals.

Theory of this investment style
In some efficient markets, active management has lower returns than passive management. Also, market timing by the investor could potentially cause damage to returns.

Active management by an individual investor of "core" positions could underperform passive management after taxes and expenses in real return performance. However, the investor may gain some psychological benefit from changing their allocation. Since the "satellite" portfolio contains only a small portion of the overall portfolio (i.e. the core and satellite portfolio combined), this psychological benefit can be gained while keeping most of the portfolio in passive management.

The theory/key of the "Core/Satellite" management style is that by design and active management, it limits the taxes and the expenses inside the core holding while the 'potential return lost' from passive management is significantly offset by the strong correlation in return to large equity indexes. Additional returns, held within the satellite portfolio, come from assets with projected future returns in excess of the core benchmarks of the core portfolio after taxes, inflation and expenses.

References

Investment